Paolo Antonio Barba Bediones (born March 17, 1974) is a Filipino television host, newscaster, radio commentator and actor.

Bediones started his career as a commercial model, and later transitioned to television show hosting. He is best known for hosting GMA Network's Extra Challenge and Survivor Philippines. He is now a TV host and the newest newscaster on TV5.

On December 3, 2009, Bediones announced in a press conference that he had signed a three-year exclusive contract with TV5 (formerly ABC-5), owned by TV5 Network Inc. (formerly Associated Broadcasting Company).

Personal life
Paolo, only male child among four offspring, was born to Rodolfo Pineda Bediones (from Roxas City, Capiz) and Maria Teresa Barba who separated when Paolo was still young.  His mother Maria is the daughter of Fortuna Marcos-Barba (Paolo's maternal grandmother) who's the sister of the late former President Ferdinand Marcos (Paolo's maternal granduncle).

His late great grandfather was Maximo Bediones (1820–1932) who managed to father a son at the age of 99. Bediones has three sisters. His previous girlfriend was former beauty queen Abby Cruz.

Career

Hosting
Bediones is a former TV host of a defunct MTV Philippines program Para, Bos! and Gameplan TV where he won "Best TV Host" alongside co-hosts Suzi Entrata-Abrera and Mondo Castro of the band The Pin-Ups. His previously hosted shows on GMA Network are Channel S, Gameplan, Digital LG Challenge (formerly Digital LG Quiz), Extra Extra, Extra Challenge, ETChing, S-Files, Mornings @ GMA, Whammy! Push Your Luck, Unang Hirit, Tok! Tok! Tok! Isang Milyon Pasok!, Pinoy Meets World, and Survivor Philippines (Seasons 1 and 2) on GMA and hosted Sapul sa Singko (formerly Sapul) on TV5.

He returned to hosting as the host of Extreme Makeover: Home Edition Philippines, which premiered on TV5 in 2012. He later hosted Rescue 5, Demolition Job, and Astig, also on TV5.

Newscasting
In 2010, Bediones became a news anchor of Aksyon alongside Cheryl Cosim and later Erwin Tulfo. This was his first time as a newscaster for News5.

He was also given a public affairs program USI: Under Special Investigation on TV5 which aired every Sunday night.

On February 18, 2011, Bediones left Aksyon for Aksyon JournalisMO as a replacement to Martin Andanar. There, he joined Cheri Mercado and Jove Francisco.

On February 22, 2012, Bediones joined together with Cheri Mercado to anchor a former news program entitled Pilipinas News replacing the former news program, Aksyon Journalismo.

On July 21, 2014, Bediones reunited with Cheryl Cosim for a new news program entitled Aksyon Tonite. He left the newscast in late August, as he would shortly start a new restaurant business.

In 2021, after 5 years of his hiatus, Bediones returned to anchor Frontline Sa Umaga, marking his 5th overall news program on News5 via TV5. It premiered last May 10, 2021, on TV5.

Radio
Paolo was an announcer for Radyo5 92.3 News FM as a member of News5. He hosted Sakto kay Paolo, Sakto (rin) kay Cheri and the renamed Trabaho Lang with Cheri Mercado.

Filmography

Television

Online Series

Movies

Awards and recognitions
Winner, Best Showbiz Oriented Talk Show Host for S-Files - 2005 PMPC Star Awards For Television (Tied w/ Boy Abunda of "The Buzz")
Winner, Best Reality Competition Program Hosts for Extra Challenge - PMPC Star Awards For Television (2004, 2005 & 2006) (w/ Ethel Booba)
Winner, Best Travel Show Hosts for Pinoy Meets World - 21st PMPC Star Awards For Television 2007 (w/ Miriam Quiambao)
Winner, Best Reality Show Host for Survivor Philippines - 23rd PMPC Star Awards For Television (2009)
Hall of Fame Winner - Aliw Awards (2000–2006)

See also
TV5 (Philippines)
GMA Network

References

1974 births
Ateneo de Manila University alumni
Filipino male television actors
Filipino television news anchors
Living people
Former Roman Catholics
Filipino Christians
Filipino evangelicals
VJs (media personalities)
Filipino Pentecostals
Filipino Protestants
People from Capiz
People from Quezon City
GMA Network personalities
GMA Integrated News and Public Affairs people
TV5 (Philippine TV network) personalities
News5 people
Viva Artists Agency
Visayan people
Filipino male film actors
Marcos family